Pine Hills is a census-designated place (CDP) and unincorporated subdivision in Orange County, Florida, United States, west of Orlando. Per the 2020 U.S. Census, the population was 66,111. It is a part of the Orlando–Kissimmee–Sanford, Florida Metropolitan Statistical Area (home to 2,134,311 people in 2010).

Pine Hills is home to several parks, five elementary schools, two middle schools, and one high school. As a part of the Florida Coast To Coast Bicycle Trail, the Pine Hills Trail is also being developed running from Barnett Park through the middle of the community to Clarcona-Ocoee Road. As a result of residential demographic shifts, the area has been described as a minority majority community. In response to years of neglect and blight, several revitalization efforts are currently underway in the community bringing results.

History

The area that would become Pine Hills began in 1953 with the first subdivisions – Robinswood and Pine Ridge Estates – constructed along the newly completed Pine Hills Road north of Colonial Drive (SR 50). It was one of the first suburbs of Orlando and grew as a bedroom community for the workers of Martin Marietta (now Lockheed Martin). At the time, it was an upper-middle class suburb with a country club named "Silver Pines".

During the 1960s and into the 1970s, Pine Hills grew north from the original subdivisions around Pine Hills Rd and Colonial Drive to include new neighborhoods off of Silver Star Rd in the north around Powers Dr and to the east around Pine Hills and Indian Hill Roads. The community built its own fire department, a post office branch, and several schools. In the 1970s, the Orange County government seized Pine Hills' fire engine in an effort to consolidate county-wide fire services. Nevertheless, Pine Hills continued to grow and community leaders began an initiative to incorporate Pine Hills into a city. However, this initiative was eventually abandoned. Several Orange County Commissioners and Florida State House of Representatives and Senators have lived and worked in Pine Hills. During the 1980s, the City of Orlando began annexing sections of Pine Hills. Some areas annexed during this time include North Lane east of Pine Hills Road, Clarion Drive south of Clarcona-Ocoee Road, and areas of the Signal Hill subdivision. Residents rejected further annexation, fearing larger taxes and little representation from Orlando. Eventually, as Orlando's growth surrounded Pine Hills, many of the original families moved into newer neighborhoods in nearby Ocoee, Winter Garden and MetroWest.

Into the late 1980s and during the 1990s, Pine Hills fell into a state of decline. Silver Pines Country Club was closed, and apartment complexes were built on the property in the mid-1990s. The "Pine Hills Shopping Center" lost its long-time tenants and was eventually converted in the late 1990s into "Pine Hills Marketplace", a strip mall with discount stores. As newer neighborhoods developed offering more housing options, rental rates dropped and housing became more affordable for residents. Paired with the long-term effects of post-desegregation white flight, neglect from the Orange County government, particularly from the Orange County Board of Commissioners, has resulted in higher crime, and the perpetuation of the "'Crime Hills' narrative'" that the area is a less safe, or desirable place to live. As of 2013, Pine Hills' perception as a high-crime area has begun to shift in a positive direction, by virtue of community-wide initiatives and efforts led by residents. Many schools and churches offer after-school programs and to some extent, free daycare. The Orlando Police Department has collaborated with the Orange County Sheriff's Office to prevent crime by increasing patrols through the neighborhoods. The government of Orange County is also increasing code enforcement and issuing citations to property owners who neglect to maintain their home's appearance.

Recent developments in Pine Hills included the reconstruction of Maynard Evans High School's main campus on Silver Star Road; completed in 2012. Reconstruction with the latest technology was also completed at Meadowbrook Middle,  Robinswood Middle, Pine Hills, Rolling Hills, and Mollie E. Ray Elementary Schools. Additional development includes Orlando's newest "Chinatown", located along west Colonial Drive across from the Pine Hills Marketplace. West Colonial Drive, one of the main highways in Pine Hills, was redesigned and construction completed in 2011, bringing better traffic management and improved landscaping to Pine Hills. Other traffic improvement initiatives in Pine Hills included repaving and redesigning the intersection of Pine Hills and Silver Star Roads. Future initiatives include the expansion of Pine Hills Road south to LB Mcleod Road. Lynx, the local transportation agency, is constructing a SuperStop transit connection for multiple bus routes to provide easy access for workers.

Neighborhood revitalization

The most recent effort to revitalize Pine Hills began with the creation of the "Pine Hills Safe Neighborhood Partnership". It is a group of neighborhood residents who collaborate with the Orange County Government and local law enforcement agencies in an effort to keep the area safe. The group is a 501c3 non-profit organization and has received grant funding from private and public resources. The grants fund a variety of projects designed to deter crime and enhance resident safety. Some initiatives include hiring off-duty law enforcement officers to make extra patrols, offering summer youth programs to keep youth engaged, and helping neighborhoods make infrastructure improvements to traffic patterns, community lighting, and more. Regular community meetings are held at the Pine Hills Community Center.

In 2004, the Pine Hills Community Council, Inc. commissioned the Pine Hills Land Analysis and Strategic Plan, which outlined a vision for revitalization and economic growth supported by residents. Since this study was released, the neighborhood has continued to focus on revitalization initiatives by holding community forums, establishing partnerships with private developers and public agencies. It also engages property owners and renters in protecting the area's quality of life. As a result of the community partnerships and focus on crime prevention, the sheriff's office has reported downward crime trends in this area. Additionally, in October 2009, Mayor Richard Crotty established the Pine Hills Business Redevelopment Task Force. This 13-member advisory committee was created to assist with the economic revitalization of the area.

Diversity

Pine Hills is one of the most ethnically diverse regions of the Greater Orlando metropolitan area and is a minority majority community. The populations of African-Americans and Hispanics are reported to be significantly above the state of Florida's average. The foreign-born population is also above the state average. There are large Caribbean populations of Haitians, Jamaicans, and Puerto Ricans. There is also a large Asian population of Vietnamese, Koreans, and Cambodians. This diversity is evident along Pine Hills Road where many immigration offices, Caribbean and Asian restaurants, and West Indian grocery stores abound.

Several flourishing neighborhoods exist where the median family income exceeds the area average. Subdivisions close to Pine Hills with expensive single-family homes are found in the nearby Rosemont neighborhood, which was the first planned development created within the City of Orlando. Expensive homes are also located off Balboa Drive near Good Homes Road in the Rose Hill subdivision and along north Powers Drive. A near-replica of Elvis Presley's Graceland Mansion, constructed in 1981, is located off North Hiawassee Road in the Hyland Oaks subdivision.

In 2010, Evans High School became the first UCF-Certified Community Partnership School  in the state of Florida, established through a collaboration between the Children's Home Society of Florida, Orange County Public Schools, and the University of Central Florida. Since Evans became a Community Partnership School, student test scores and other metrics have significantly increased, Ellis says. Especially notable: Evans’ graduation rate has improved from 64 percent in the 2010–2011 school year (when CPS efforts began) to 87 percent in the 2016–2017 school year. Prior to becoming a Community Partnership School, Evans was labeled a “dropout factory” by Johns Hopkins University.

Geography
Pine Hills is located at  (28.574876, -81.457267).

Demographics

2020 census

Note: the US Census treats Hispanic/Latino as an ethnic category. This table excludes Latinos from the racial categories and assigns them to a separate category. Hispanics/Latinos can be of any race.

2018 American Community Survey
As of 2018, there were 24,199 households, out of which 4% were vacant. As of 2000, 38.3% had children under the age of 18 living with them, 41% were married couples living together, 28.7% had a female householder with no husband present, and 27.5% were non-families. 21.2% of all households were made up of individuals, and 6.9% had someone living alone who was 65 years of age or older.  The average household size was 3.11 and the average family size was 3.53.

In 2018, the CDP population was spread out, with 51% under the age of 18, 10.2% from 18 to 24, 30.6% from 25 to 44, 18.4% from 45 to 64, and 7.9% who were 65 years of age or older.  The median age was 30 years. For every 100 females, there were 92.9 males.  For every 100 females age 18 and over, there were 88.2 males.

In 2018, the median income for a household in the CDP was $37,158 and the median income for a family was $41,063. Males had a median income of $29,676 versus $27,435 for females. The per capita income for the CDP was $16,137.  About 12.5% of families and 14.9% of the population were below the poverty line, including 25.4% of those under age 18 and 14.8% of those age 65 or over.

Languages
As of 2000, English spoken as a first language accounted for 66.00% of all residents, while 26.99% spoke other languages as their mother tongue. The most significant were Spanish speakers who made up 12.45% of the population, while Haitian Creole came up as the third most spoken language, which made up 10.76%, French was at fourth, at 1.76%, and Vietnamese was spoken by 1.44% of the population.

Economy

The primary industry in Pine Hills is retail. Major companies with a presence in Pine Hills are Walmart Neighborhood Market, The Home Depot, Lowe's, Sam's Club, Darden Restaurants, CVS/pharmacy, Walgreens, O'Reilly Auto Parts and Winn-Dixie. West Colonial Drive is also known as "car row" with many car dealerships lining the street.  The Central Florida Fairgrounds offers a fruit and vegetable market every Saturday as well as concerts and other events. The community's football teams play at its site.  The Orange County Environmental Division is located in the area.

With its proximity to Interstate 4 and Highway 408, there are many small industrial businesses in this section of town. The industrial sector located along east Silver Star Road in Orlando's city limits includes a Frito-Lay and Coca-Cola manufacturing and distribution facilities.  This sector of Orange County has some of the highest-rated warehouse properties.  Many marble and flooring companies are located in this part of the county.

Due to its central location, Pine Hills is close to Orlando's business and tourism centers. There is good public transportation through the local transit authority, Lynx. Also, the Greyhound bus station is conveniently close.

Education

Elementary schools
 Hiawassee Elementary
 Lake Gem Elementary
 Mollie E. Ray Elementary
 Pine Hills Elementary
 Rolling Hills Elementary
 Ridgewood Park Elementary
 UCP Pine Hills Charter School

Middle schools
 Meadowbrook Middle School
 Robinswood Middle School

High schools
 Maynard Evans High School
 While Wekiva High School is technically located in the City of Apopka, this school boasts a large number of Pine Hills residents within its student population.

Private school
There are several private schools in Pine Hills offering Pre K-Grade 12 curriculum.

Colleges

Parks and recreation

Public parks in Pine Hills are managed by Orange County Parks and Recreation. Admission is free to all parks. There are four parks in Pine Hills:
 Barnett Park - The signature park of Pine Hills and also the largest. Home to Lawne Lake, a professional BMX track, biking and nature trails, football fields, ball fields, dog parks, and event pavilions. It is adjacent to the Central Florida Fairgrounds which hosts cultural events throughout the year.
 Rolling Hills Park - Located on North Pine Hills Road, this park has several ball fields and playgrounds.
 Signal Hill Park - Located in Orlando city limits near Rolling Hills Elementary School and managed by the City of Orlando
 Willows Park - Located in Orlando city limits and by the City of Orlando.

Infrastructure

Transportation

Arterial highways
 West Colonial Drive State Road 50
 State Road 408 - A limited-access toll road that runs east–west just south of Pine Hills in Orlo Vista
 Silver Star Road - East-west connector to U.S. Route 441 (Orange Blossom Trail)

Secondary roads
 Pine Hills Road - North to south
 Hiawassee Road - another North to South road paralleling Pine Hills road.
 Clarcona-Ocoee Road - northern border of Pine Hills and another east–west connector to Orange Blossom Trail

Tertiary roads
 Hastings Street
 Balboa Drive
 Powers Drive
 North Lane

Mass transit
Lynx is the public bus transportation system serving Greater Orlando; it has many stops throughout Pine Hills.

Notable people
 Chucky Atkins, NBA basketball player
 Darryl Dawkins, NBA basketball player
 Alan Eustace, Google senior vice president
 Alex Haynes, NFL Baltimore Ravens
 Chris Johnson, NFL Tennessee Titans
 Jeff Zimmerman, NFL Dallas Cowboys
 Kenard Lang, NFL Denver Broncos
 Thomas McClary (musician), the original Commodore, The Commodores
 Brandon Siler, NFL San Diego Chargers
 Mike Sims-Walker, NFL Jacksonville Jaguars
 Darius Washington, NBA San Antonio Spurs
 Hotboii,  Entertainer
 Maurice Allen, world champion long drive competitor, professional golfer 
 Kuttem Reese, Entertainer 
 PI Bang, American record executive

.

"Crime Hills Narrative"
Into the late 1990s and early 2000s, Pine Hills' worsening economic decline resulted in the increasingly negative public perception of the area in local media, and public discourse.

In recent years, this pattern of unfavorable media coverage of Pine Hills has resulted in heated disagreements over the causes and nature of the current state of the area often play out publicly on online forums, exacerbated by the generational divide of residents that lived in Pine Hills during its most economically prosperous time, and more recent generations of residents. In most cases, former residents, and their descendants, react to unfavorable coverage with backlash, echoing negative stereotypes and discrediting successes of community-led efforts to address poverty-related crimes, and general insecurity. This phenomenon has since been coined, "The Crime Hills narrative" by Pine Hills Partnership Inc., a local 501(c)3 watchdog organization, active in the Pine Hills area.

In October 2020, local news reports indicated the area suffered a six-month gang war that had killed five people, including a three-year-old child. Although, the same period in question saw a significant spike in violent crimes, and notable shootings, across Orange County, and Greater Orlando.

Notes and references

External links
 Pine Hills Community Council
 Evans Community School

Census-designated places in Orange County, Florida
Greater Orlando
Census-designated places in Florida